Ayrault is a surname. Notable people with the surname include:

 Dan Ayrault (1935–1990), American competition rower and Olympic champion
 Bob Ayrault (born 1966), former Major League Baseball pitcher
 Jean-Marc Ayrault (born 1950), prime minister of France from 2012 to 2014
 Joe Ayrault (born 1971), former Major League Baseball catcher
 Theodore Ayrault Dodge (1842–1909), American officer and military historian